The 1991 UK & Ireland Greyhound Racing Year was the 65th year of greyhound racing in the United Kingdom and Ireland.

Roll of honour

Summary
The National Greyhound Racing Club (NGRC) released the annual returns, with totalisator turnover at £97,311,283 and attendances recorded at 3,979,090 from 6051 meetings. Track tote deduction remained at 17.5%.

An industry discussion concluded that a greyhound's career longevity was reduced by two breeding factors. The first factor being the fact that breeding was predominantly conducted between the fastest middles distance stars and therefore increasing the average speed (bringing higher injury rates) and eliminating the stamina of stayers and marathon greyhounds. The second factor was the lack of coursing bloodlines, thereby reducing the durability traits. The physical difference between a 1930s and 1990s greyhound was significant and despite advancement in track preparation the track layouts remained the same.

Bobs Regan trained by Brian Timcke was voted Greyhound of the Year after winning the Golden Jacket, the Kent St Leger and the Regency. Ardfert Mick was voted Irish Greyhound of the Year after winning the 1991 Irish Greyhound Derby. John McGee won the Greyhound Trainer of the Year for the fourth successive year, a new record beating the three won by George Curtis and Phil Rees Sr. McGee notched over 200 winners during the year.

Ravage Again won his 29th successive race at Sunderland but then on 26 January at Powderhall at odds of 2-9 he stumbled out of the boxes and found trouble, failing to catch the winner Base Rate. The world record attempt was over and he was immediately retired.

Tracks
A & S Leisure (owners of five casino restaurants) purchased Sheffield and spent £3 million on refurbishment. Ramsgate secured a BAGS contract with Mick Wheble installed as the new Group Racing Manager. Stuart Netting became Ramsgate Racing Manager in place of Jeff Jefcoate. Mildenhall Stadium started racing for the first time.

Brent Walker the owners of William Hill and Hackney Wick Stadium were in a precarious position in regard to gigantic debts, which brought an uncertain future for both. In a statement to a committee of MP's, BAGS representative Tom Kelly reveals that Hackney (and other tracks) are only paid a £900 broadcasting fee for a ten race BAGS meeting that produces a £2 million turnover (£200,000 per race) for BAGS. Tory MP David Sumberg says "This £900 bugs me, it is so small"; Kelly is unconcerned by the disparity and financial difficulties of tracks and responds by saying that "the tracks must be satisfied because they apply for contracts". Over the next decade tracks will close at an alarming rate, including Hackney six years later.

Competitions
The Scottish Greyhound Derby increased prize money from £10,000 to £15,000 and was won by Phantom Flash trained by Nick Savva; the black dog had a great 1990 winning the Sussex Cup and Breeders Forum and was unlucky not to win the Irish Derby. He would later leave Savva to join trainer Patsy Byrne following a disagreement with owner Dave Hawley.

The Grand National final at Hall Green produced a memorable race after a dead heat by Ideal Man and Ballycarney Dell, the pair finished just ahead of Run On King and a promising hurdler called Kildare Slippy. Dempseys Whisper continued his good ways when becoming only the second greyhound to successfully defend the Grand Prix title at Walthamstow Stadium.

News
Tom Smith the owner of Swaffham investigates some of the track trainers kennels and finds unlicensed handlers and greyhounds missing from the establishments that they are supposed to be kennelled at, which leads to the NGRC being called in to hold a series of inquiries.

Patsy Byrne joined Wimbledon as a trainer and sponsors the International while Maggie Lucas leaves Hackney for Romford. The Mullins family split camp as Linda Mullins’s son David takes out his first trainers licence at Sunderland. Sunderland had only returned to NGRC rules in 1990 were improving their profile by taking on Mullins and former top flapping man Ted Soppitt, in addition Harry Williams who was responsible for getting the new Sunderland of the ground started training again. 
There were two major trainer changes towards the latter part of the year both involving Walthamstow, Linda Mullins was recruited from Romford to increase Walthamstow's recent policy of bringing in leading open race trainers. As a consequence Walthamstow's top man Kenny Linzell left to join Romford after being unhappy with the new policy. Former English and Irish Derby winning trainer John Bassett died in March aged 81.

Wheres The Limo trained by Linda Mullins won 28 from 45 starts to be leading open race winner.

An ITV production called Gone to the Dogs filmed at Walthamstow and starring Jim Broadbent, Martin Clunes, Harry Enfield, Alison Steadman and Sheila Hancock is a success after viewing figures of nine million.

Principal UK races

dh=dead heat

Principal Irish finals

Totalisator returns

The totalisator returns declared to the National Greyhound Racing Club for the year 1991 are listed below.

References 

Greyhound racing in the United Kingdom
Greyhound racing in the Republic of Ireland
UK and Ireland Greyhound Racing Year
UK and Ireland Greyhound Racing Year
UK and Ireland Greyhound Racing Year
UK and Ireland Greyhound Racing Year